Highway 163 (AR 163, Ark. 163, and Hwy. 163) is a north–south state highway in Northeast Arkansas. A spur route runs in Jonesboro. All routes are maintained by the Arkansas Department of Transportation (ArDOT). Almost all of the route is concurrent with Crowley's Ridge Parkway, with a portion also serving as an Arkansas Heritage Trail for its use during the Civil War.

Route description
Highway 163 runs in Northeast Arkansas, a region mostly characterized by the Arkansas Delta, a sparsely populated rural area with farms and small settlements. However, Highway 163 runs its entire length along Crowley's Ridge, a small loess ridge rising above the flat Delta. The route passes several cultural and historical points in the region, including a historic cotton gin and an American Civil War trail.

State maintenance begins at Wittsburg near the Wittsburg Store and Gas Station, with the roadway continuing south as a county road. Highway 163 runs north to a junction with US 64 and the Crowley's Ridge Parkway (CRP). The routes briefly overlap to the east, with Highway 163/CRP turning north and passing the John H. Johnston Cotton Gin Historic District and the Capt. Isaac N. Deadrick House, both listed on the National Register of Historic Places. Highway 163/CRP run north, serving as the eastern terminus for Highway 364 and meeting Highway 42 near Birdeye. After crossing into Poinsett County, the routes serve as the southern terminus of Highway 373 before passing Lake Poinsett State Park. Highway 163/CRP intersect Highway 14 east of Harrisburg, including a brief overlap. Continuing north, Highway 163/CRP intersect Highway 214, Highway 158, and Highway 69 before entering Craighead County.

Highway 163 has a junction with Highway 158 in southern Craighead County before turning northwest toward Jonesboro. Shortly after entering the city, Highway 163 Spur begins at the parent route, running north as Apt Drive through a residential subdivision. Highway 163 continues west, intersecting with Highway 1, where it terminates, with the roadway continuing north as Highway 1B.

History
Between Jonesboro and US 64, Highway 163 is designated as an Arkansas Heritage Trail. During the Civil War, Union General John Wynn Davidson used the route to march cavalry from southeast Missouri down Crowley's Ridge, following a rumor Confederate General Sterling Price's army was planning to attack Missouri via Crowley's Ridge. After marching and finding no Confederates, General Davidson headed west and started the Little Rock Campaign in 1863.

The route was established by the Arkansas State Highway Commission (ASHC) on July 10, 1957, beginning at the Poinsett County line and running south through Birdeye to a county road. The route was created in accordance with Act 148 of the 1957 General Assembly. It was extended south to Levesque on June 29, 1960. A second segment was created from Lake Poinsett State Park to Harrisburg on June 23, 1965, though the gap between the routes was closed four months later. The route was extended north to Jonesboro on July 29, 1976; the same order created the spur route.

On June 30, 1983, the route was extended south from Levesque to Wittsburg, along the original 1926 alignment of Highway 163. The extension was made in exchange for decommissioning a segment of Highway 364 at the request of the county judge of Cross County.

Major intersections
Mile markers reset at some concurrencies.

Jonesboro spur

Highway 163 Spur (AR 163S, Ark. 163S, Hwy. 163S, and Apt Drive) is a  spur route in Jonesboro.

Major intersections

Former route

The route began at Wittsburg and ran north to US 64 at Levesque.

History
Highway 163 was created on May 28, 1942. However, the route does not appear on the next statewide map in 1945 nor the Cross County map in 1947.

Major intersections

See also

 List of state highways in Arkansas

Notes

References

 

Arkansas Heritage Trails System
Crowley's Ridge Parkway
Jonesboro, Arkansas
163
Transportation in Craighead County, Arkansas
Transportation in Poinsett County, Arkansas
Transportation in Cross County, Arkansas